Language Barrier is a studio album by Jamaican musical duo Sly and Robbie, released in 1985 by Island Records. The album features guest musicians Herbie Hancock, Bob Dylan, Afrika Bambaataa, and Manu DiBango.

Release and reception
AllMusic awarded the album with three stars and its review by Scott Bultman states: "Sly & Robbie team with producer Bill Laswell for an edgy dub set". Village Voice critic Robert Christgau called it a "world-music mishmash".

The single "Make 'Em Move" reached No. 83 in the UK Singles Chart in November 1985.
The album brought the duo international recognition and led on to their subsequent hit album Rhythm Killers in 1987.

Track listing
 "Make 'Em Move" (S. Dunbar, R. Shakespeare, B. Aasim, B. Laswell, B. Worrell) — 7:58
 "No Name On The Bullet" (S. Dunbar, R. Shakespeare) — 6:03
 "Miles (Black Satin)" (Miles Davis, S. Dunbar, R. Shakespeare, B. Laswell) — 7:20
 "Bass And Trouble" (B. Laswell, S. Dunbar, R. Shakespeare, Manu Dibango) — 7:58
 "Language Barrier" (Wally Badarou, S. Dunbar, R. Shakespeare, M. Chung, B. Reynolds) — 6:51
 "Get To This, Get To That" (S. Dunbar, R. Shakespeare, B. Fowler, B. Worrell) — 5:17

Personnel
Musicians
 Sly Dunbar – drums, percussion 
 Robbie Shakespeare – bass
 Wally Badarou – keyboards
 Herbie Hancock – keyboards
 Bernie Worrell – keyboards
 Robbie Lyn – keyboards
 Manu Dibango –saxophone
 Bob Dylan – harmonica
 Africa Bambaataa – vocals
 Bernard Fowler – vocals
 Doug E Fresh – human beatbox
 Eddie Martinez – guitar
 Pat Thrall – guitar
 Mike Hampton – guitar
 Mikey Chung – guitar
 Barry Reynolds – guitar
 Daniel Ponce – percussion

Technical personnel
 Clive Smith – Fairlight CMI programming
 Robert Musso, Steven Stanley, Solgie – engineers
 Howie Weinberg – mastering
 Tony Wright – art direction
 Chris Garnham – photography
 Issey Miyake – glasses

References 

1985 albums
Albums produced by Bill Laswell
Island Records albums
Sly and Robbie albums